is a Japanese production company, a subsidiary of the Japanese publishing group Hitotsubashi Group.

Notable filmography 
 A Penguin's Troubles
 Departures
 Doraemon
 Pokemon
 Pokémon: The First Movie
 Pokémon: The Movie 2000
 Pokémon 3: The Movie
 Celebi: Voice of the Forest
 Pokémon Heroes: Latios and Latias
 Psychic Squad 
 Case Closed
 Hamtaro
 Hayate the Combat Butler
 Inuyasha
 MegaMan NT Warrior
 Onipan!
 Ranma ½
 SHIMONETA: A Boring World Where the Concept of Dirty Jokes Doesn’t Exist
 Touch
 Urusei Yatsura
 Ushio & Tora
 Zoids: Chaotic Century
 Zoids Zero
 Zoids: Fuzors
 Zoids Genesis

References

External links 
  

Shogakukan
Shueisha
Hitotsubashi Group
Mass media companies based in Tokyo
Anime companies